My Kitchen Rules SA is a South African reality television show based on the popular Australian reality television series My Kitchen Rules. The show premiered in South Africa on M-Net in 2017. In 2019, My Kitchen Rules SA won the SAFTA for Best International Format Show.

References

External links

My Kitchen Rules
Food reality television series
South African reality television series
2010s South African television series
2017 South African television series debuts
Non-Australian television series based on Australian television series